The Nightingale and the Bells is a Canadian musical comedy-drama film, directed by René Delacroix and released in 1952. Considered an important landmark in the Cinema of Quebec, the film stars Gérard Barbeau as Guy Boyer, a young boy with both a penchant for getting into trouble and an exceptionally good singing voice, who is engaged by the local Roman Catholic priest (Clément Latour) to perform at a concert to raise funds for the church to acquire new bells.

The cast also includes Nicole Germain as Nicole Payette, a concert pianist who is asked to perform at the fundraising concert but is reluctant, and Jean Coutu as René, her impresario boyfriend, as well as Juliette Béliveau, Ovila Légaré, Roger Baulu and Juliette Huot in supporting roles.

The film was shot in Saint-Hyacinthe, Quebec, in 1951, and was released to theatres in early 1952.

References

External links
 

1952 films
1952 comedy-drama films
Canadian musical comedy-drama films
Quebec films
French-language Canadian films
Films shot in Quebec
Films set in Quebec
Films directed by René Delacroix
1950s Canadian films
1950s French-language films